The Winnetuxet River is a  river in southeastern Massachusetts. It flows west from an unnamed pond near Cole Mill in Carver, through Plympton and Halifax, to the Taunton River.

References

External links
Environmental Protection Agency

Rivers of Plymouth County, Massachusetts
Taunton River watershed
Rivers of Massachusetts